DYLY-TV is a commercial relay television station owned by ABS-CBN Corporation. Its studio and transmitter are located at Barangay 4 (Poblacion), San Jose de Buenavista, Antique. This station is currently inactive.

ABS-CBN TV-44 local programs 
TV Patrol Panay (simulcast from TV-10 Iloilo with relay on TV-21 Roxas)
Kapamilya Winner Ka! (simulcast from TV-4 Bacolod with relay on TV-10 Iloilo, TV-9 Kalibo and TV-21 Roxas) 
MAG TV Na, Amiga! (simulcast from TV-4 Bacolod with relay on TV-10 Iloilo, TV-9 Kalibo and TV-21 Roxas)
Agri Tayo Dito

See also
 List of ABS-CBN Corporation channels and stations

Television stations in Antique (province)
Television channels and stations established in 2005
ABS-CBN stations